Yangju Citizen Football Club is a South Korean football club based in the city of Yangju, located south of Dongducheon and north of Uijeongbu not far from Seoul. It is currently a member of the K3 League, the third tier of league football in South Korea.

Players

Current team squad
as of July 2, 2022

Honours
K3 League
Winners: (1) 2008
Runners-Up: (1) 2011

Season by season records

See also
 List of football clubs in South Korea

External links
 Yangju Citizen F.C. unofficial website

K3 League clubs
K3 League (2007–2019) clubs
Sport in Gyeonggi Province
Yangju
Association football clubs established in 2007
2007 establishments in South Korea